Wallace Carl Riddick Jr. (August 4, 1864 – June 9, 1942) was an American football coach and college administrator. Riddick received his A.B. degree from the University of North Carolina at Chapel Hill and his degree in civil engineering from Lehigh University in Pennsylvania. He served as a consultant for several water projects and for the Seaboard Railroad. Riddick was also a member of the Board of Visitors for the United States Naval Academy and of several state boards and committees. Because of his advocacy on the students' behalf, Riddick was awarded with the Officer's Cross of the Order of St. Sava by King Alexander of Yugoslavia in 1931.

Coaching career
Riddick served as the head football coach at Wake Forest University from 1888 to 1889, and at North Carolina College of Agriculture and Mechanic Arts, now North Carolina State University, from 1898 to 1899, compiling a career college football record of 4–6–2

North Carolina State University
Riddick assumed the presidency at North Carolina State University following Daniel Harvey Hill Jr.'s resignation in 1917. Riddick's administration added work to chemical, ceramics and aeronautics engineering, and developed an engineering experiment station. Riddick resigned as president in 1923 to become dean of the newly established school of engineering, and served in this capacity until his retirement in 1937. Riddick Stadium and Riddick Hall on N.C. State's campus were both named in honor of the former leader. NCSU Libraries Special Collections Research Center serves as the repository for Wallace Carl Riddick's manuscript collection.

Death
Riddick died at a Baltimore hospital on June 9, 1942 after weeks of ill health. His wife had predeceased him by a few weeks.

Head coaching record

References

External links
 

1864 births
1942 deaths
NC State Wolfpack football coaches
Chancellors of North Carolina State University
Wake Forest Demon Deacons football coaches
Lehigh University alumni
University of North Carolina at Chapel Hill alumni
Officers of the Order of St. Sava
People from Wake County, North Carolina